The Arachnopusiidae is a family within the bryozoan order Cheilostomatida.

References 

Bryozoan families
Cheilostomatida
Extant Eocene first appearances